Encinal County was a former Texas county. Its area is now completely contained in the present Webb County.

History
Encinal County was established on February 1, 1856 and was to consist of the eastern portion of present-day Webb County. The law creating the county called for a county seat at an unspecified location to be called Encinal; however, the seat was never established. The present town of Encinal, located nearby in La Salle County, had not yet adopted its current name at the time Encinal County was created. The county was never organized and was finally absorbed into Webb County on March 12, 1899.

Geography
The Texas state law that created the county of Encinal laid out the following boundaries:

The following limits, to wit: beginning at the north-west corner of Duval county, thence due west with the south line of La Salle to its south-west corner; thence due south to the line of Zapata county; thence with the lines of Zapata and Starr, to the south-west corner of Duval county; thence north with the west line of Duval, to the beginning, shall constitute the county of Encinal, the county seat therof shall bear the same name.

Adjacent counties
La Salle County (north)
Duval County (east)
Zapata County (south)
Webb County (west)

Demographics
Population statistics for Encinal County, Texas from U.S. Census data tabulated between the creation and dissolution of the county:

References

External links
 

Former counties of Texas
Webb County, Texas
1856 establishments in Texas
1899 disestablishments in Texas